Dorado Needle is an  mountain summit located in North Cascades National Park in Skagit County of Washington state. It can be seen from  the North Cascades Highway west of Marblemount at a road pullout along the Skagit River. The first ascent of the peak was made in July 1940 by Lloyd Anderson, Karl Boyer, and Tom Gorton via the Northwest Ridge. Precipitation runoff and glacier meltwater from the mountain drains into tributaries of the Skagit River.

Climate

Dorado Needle is located in the marine west coast climate zone of western North America. Most weather fronts originate in the Pacific Ocean, and travel northeast toward the Cascade Mountains. As fronts approach the North Cascades, they are forced upward by the peaks of the Cascade Range, causing them to drop their moisture in the form of rain or snowfall onto the Cascades (Orographic lift). As a result, the west side of the North Cascades experiences high precipitation, especially during the winter months in the form of snowfall. During winter months, weather is usually cloudy, but, due to high pressure systems over the Pacific Ocean that intensify during summer months, there is often little or no cloud cover during the summer. Because of maritime influence, snow tends to be wet and heavy, resulting in high avalanche danger.

Geology

The North Cascades features some of the most rugged topography in the Cascade Range with craggy peaks, spires, ridges, and deep glacial valleys. Geological events occurring many years ago created the diverse topography and drastic elevation changes over the Cascade Range leading to the various climate differences.

The history of the formation of the Cascade Mountains dates back millions of years ago to the late Eocene Epoch. With the North American Plate overriding the Pacific Plate, episodes of volcanic igneous activity persisted. In addition, small fragments of the oceanic and continental lithosphere called terranes created the North Cascades about 50 million years ago.

During the Pleistocene period dating back over two million years ago, glaciation advancing and retreating repeatedly scoured and shaped the landscape. A small glacial remnant lies on the south slope of Dorado Needle, whereas the northern slope maintains the extensive McAllister Glacier.  The U-shaped cross section of the river valleys are a result of recent glaciation. Uplift and faulting in combination with glaciation have been the dominant processes which have created the tall peaks and deep valleys of the North Cascades area.

Climbing Routes
Climbing Routes on Dorado Needle

 Dorado Needle SW Buttress -    9 pitches
 Dorado Needle East Ridge - 
 Dorado Needle NW Ridge -    3 pitches

Gallery

See also

 Geography of the North Cascades
 Geology of the Pacific Northwest

References

External links
North Cascades National Park National Park Service

Mountains of Washington (state)
North Cascades National Park
Mountains of Skagit County, Washington
North Cascades
North American 2000 m summits